The bronze-winged woodpecker (Colaptes aeruginosus) is a species of bird in subfamily Picinae of the woodpecker family Picidae. It is endemic to northeastern Mexico.

Taxonomy and systematics

The bronze-winged woodpecker was originally described as Chrysopicus aeruginosus. It was later placed in genus Piculus but since about 2007 has been moved into Colaptes by taxonomic systems. The International Ornithological Committee (IOC) and BirdLife International's Handbook of the Birds of the World consider it a species. The American Ornithological Society and the Clements taxonomy treat it as a subspecies of the golden-olive woodpecker (C. rubiginosus).

The bronze-winged woodpecker is monotypic.

Description

Males and females have the same plumage except on their heads. Adult males have a slate gray forehead and crown with a red border back from above the eye to the red nape. They are pale buff to whitish from their lores around the eye to the red of the nape. They have a wide red malar stripe and a pale buffy white chin and upper throat; the last has heavy blackish streaks. Adult females have red only on their nape. Both sexes have mostly green upperparts with a bronze tinge; their rump and uppertail coverts are paler and barred with dark olive. Their flight feathers are dark brownish olive with greenish edges and some yellowish on the shafts. Their tail is brown. Their underparts are pale buffy yellow with blackish olive scale-shaped bars. Their medium-length bill is slaty gray to black, their iris deep dull red, and the legs gray to olive-gray. Juveniles are generally duller than adults and have less well defined barring on their underparts.

Distribution and habitat

The bronze-winged woodpecker is found in eastern Mexico between the states of Tamaulipas and Veracruz. It inhabits subtropical dry forest, secondary forest, and plantations. In elevation it ranges from sea level to

Behavior

Movement

As far as is known, the bronze-winged woodpecker is a year-round resident throughout its range.

Feeding

The Cornell Lab of Ornithology's online Birds of the World does not describe the bronze-winged woodpecker's feeding techniques or diet separately from that of the golden-olive woodpecker sensu lato (which see here).

Breeding

The bronze-winged woodpecker's breeding season is between January and May. As with foraging and diet, further data on breeding are not separated from those of the golden-olive woodpecker, which see here.

Vocalization

The bronze-winged woodpecker's song is a "deliberate slow-paced series of...high-pitched calls, kwi, kwi, kwi, kwi, kwi, kwi"; it differs significantly from the "rising rattling trill" of the golden-olive woodpecker sensu stricto.

Status

The IUCN has assessed the bronze-winged woodpecker as being of Least Concern. It has a large range, and though its population size is not known it is believed to be stable. No immediate threats have been identified.

References 

bronze-winged woodpecker
Birds of Mexico
bronze-winged woodpecker
bronze-winged woodpecker
Endemic birds of Mexico